The Farman F.30A C2 was a two-seat biplane designed as a fighter in France in 1916 and powered by a single, water-cooled radial engine.  It showed poor flight characteristics and only one was built, though it was modified twice. It should not be confused with the similarly named Henry Farman HF.30 of 1915, a completely different aircraft which was used in large numbers by the Imperial Russian Air Service.

Design and development
The F.30 representing a departure from the pusher configuration with which Farman had previously been associated, adopting what was becoming the more conventional aeroplane design, with the propeller at the front and a continuous streamlined fuselage, first flew in December 1916.

The F.30A was a metal framed biplane with considerable overhang of the upper planes, a fairly common feature of Henry Farman's designs (as in the F.40), though possibly it was not strictly a sesquiplane.  The inner part of the wing structure, out to the tips of the lower wing,  formed a single bay unit, without stagger and braced by simple parallel interplane struts.  These struts continued above the upper surface, with the outer parts of the upper wing wire braced to them.  Ailerons were fitted to the outer, upper wings.

The fuselage was mounted between the wings on central struts above and below and was circular in cross-section, tapering towards the tail. The horizontal tail surfaces were rectangular, and the rudder and wide chord fin formed a shallow triangle.  There were two cockpits, seating the pilot under the wing and the gunner further aft with a large radiator between them. The  water-cooled Canton-Unné X-9 radial engine gave the F.30A a short nose.  Its simple conventional undercarriage had a single mainwheel on each main leg and radius arm.

By May 1917 the F.30A was undergoing official evaluation by the Service Technique de l'Aéronautique (STAé ) at Villacoublay, where the positioning of the radiator between the two crew was disliked and the handling found to be poor, causing rejection of the aircraft. Farman then modified it by shortening the upper span and using a more powerful engine, another water-cooled radial, the  Salmson 9Za. Farman did this with an increase of span, the larger upper wing now extending  from tip to tip. Trials of what was now known as the F.30B AR2 resumed at the STAé resumed in early 1918, but by April the lack of both lateral and longitudinal stability caused tests and the aircraft's development to be abandoned.

Variants
Data from:French aircraft of the First World War
F.30A C22-seat fighter  Canton-Unné X-9 water-cooled radial engine, first flown in December 1916; one built.
F.30B C2Modification with  Salmson 9Za 9-cylinder water-cooled radial.

Specifications (F.30B)

References

Bibliography

External links

 Photo of the Farman F.30 B, late 1917

1910s French military aircraft
F.30
1910s French fighter aircraft
Aircraft first flown in 1916